Claudia Vera Jones (21 February 1915 – 24 December 1964) was a Trinidad and Tobago-born journalist and activist. As a child, she migrated with her family to the US, where she became a Communist political activist, feminist and black nationalist, adopting the name Jones as "self-protective disinformation". Due to the political persecution of Communists in the US, she was deported in 1955 and subsequently lived in the United Kingdom. Upon arriving in the UK, she immediately joined the Communist Party of Great Britain and would remain a member for the rest of her life. She then founded Britain's first major black newspaper, the West Indian Gazette, in 1958, and played a central role in founding the Notting Hill Carnival, the second-largest annual carnival in the world.

Early life
Claudia Vera Cumberbatch was born in Trinidad, then a colony of the British Empire, on 21 February 1915. When she was eight years old, her family emigrated to New York City following the post-war cocoa price crash in Trinidad. Her mother died five years later, and her father eventually found work to support the family. Jones won the Theodore Roosevelt Award for Good Citizenship at her junior high school. In 1932, due to poor living conditions in Harlem, she was struck with tuberculosis at the age of 17. The disease caused irreparable damage to her lungs leading to lengthy stays in hospitals throughout her life. She graduated from high school, but her family could not afford the expenses to attend her graduation ceremony. Jones joined the Young Communist League (YCL) in 1936 after hearing the Communist Party's defence of the Scottsboro Boys. She went on to work on the YCL's newspaper, later becoming state education director and chairperson for the YCL.

United States career

Despite being academically bright, being classed as an immigrant woman severely limited Jones' career choices. Instead of going to college she began working in a laundry, and subsequently found other retail work in Harlem. During this time she joined a drama group, and began to write a column called "Claudia Comments" for a Harlem journal.

In 1936, trying to find organisations supporting the Scottsboro Boys, she joined the Young Communist League USA. The American communist movement's opposition to the Italian invasion of Ethiopia, was another factor which prompted Jones to join the communists. In 1937 she joined the editorial staff of the Daily Worker, rising by 1938 to become editor of the Weekly Review. After the Young Communist League became American Youth for Democracy during World War II, Jones became editor of its monthly journal, Spotlight. After the war, Jones became executive secretary of the Women's National Commission, secretary for the Women's Commission of the Communist Party USA (CPUSA), and in 1952 took the same position at the National Peace Council. In 1953, she took over the editorship of Negro Affairs.

Black feminist leader in the Communist Party
As a member of the Communist Party USA and a black nationalist and feminist, Jones'  main focus was on creating "an anti-imperialist coalition, managed by working-class leadership, fueled by the involvement of women."

Jones focused on growing the party's support for black and white women. Not only did she work towards getting Black women equal respect within the party, Jones also worked for getting Black women specifically respect in being a mother, worker, and woman. She campaigned for job training programs, equal pay for equal work, government controls on food prices, and funding for wartime childcare programs. Jones supported a subcommittee to address the "women's question". She insisted on the development in the party of theoretical training of women comrades, the organisation of women into mass organisations, daytime classes for women, and "babysitter" funds to allow for women's activism.

"An End to the Neglect of the Problems of the Negro Woman!"
Jones' best known piece of writing, "An End to the Neglect of the Problems of the Negro Woman!", appeared in 1949 in the magazine Political Affairs. It exhibits her development of what later came to be termed "intersectional" analysis within a Marxist framework. In it, she wrote:

Deportation
An elected member of the National Committee of the Communist Party USA, Jones also organised and spoke at events. As a result of her membership of CPUSA and various associated activities, in 1948 she was arrested and sentenced to the first of four spells in prison. Incarcerated on Ellis Island, she was threatened with deportation to Trinidad.

Following a hearing by the Immigration and Naturalization Service, she was found in violation of the McCarran Act for being an alien (non-US citizen) who had joined the Communist Party. Several witnesses testified to her role in party activities, and she had identified herself as a party member since 1936 when completing her Alien Registration on 24 December 1940, in conformity with the Alien Registration Act. She was ordered to be deported on 21 December 1950.

In 1951, aged 36 and in prison, she suffered her first heart attack. That same year, she was tried and convicted with 11 others, including her friend Elizabeth Gurley Flynn, of "un-American activities" under the Smith Act, specifically activities against the United States government. The charges against Jones related to an article she had written for the magazine Political Affairs under the title "Women in the Struggle for Peace and Security". The Supreme Court refused to hear their appeal. In 1955, Jones began her sentence of a year and a day at the Federal Reformatory for Women at Alderson, West Virginia. She was released on 23 October 1955.

She was refused entry to Trinidad and Tobago, in part because the colonial governor Major General Sir Hubert Elvin Rance was of the opinion that "she may prove troublesome". She was eventually offered residency in the United Kingdom on humanitarian grounds, and federal authorities agreed to allow it when she agreed to cease contesting her deportation. On 7 December 1955, at Harlem's Hotel Theresa, 350 people met to see her off.

United Kingdom activism
Jones arrived in London two weeks later, at a time when the British African-Caribbean community was expanding. Upon her arrival, the Communist Party of Great Britain (CPGB) sent several Caribbean communists to greet her. These communist activists included Billy Strachan, Winston Pinder, and Jones's cousin Trevor Carter. However, on engaging the political community in the UK, she was disappointed to find that many British communists were hostile to a black woman. She immediately joined the CPGB upon her arrival in Britain and remained a member until her death.

Activism

Jones found a community that needed active organisation. She became involved in the British African-Caribbean community to organise both access to basic facilities, as well as the early movement for equal rights.

Supported by her cousin Trevor Carter, and her friends Nadia Cattouse, Amy Ashwood Garvey, Beryl McBurnie, Pearl Prescod and her lifelong mentor Paul Robeson, Jones campaigned against racism in housing, education and employment. She addressed peace rallies and the Trade Union Congress, and visited Japan, Russia, and China, where she met with Mao Zedong.

In the early 1960s, her health failing, Jones helped organise campaigns against the Commonwealth Immigrants Bill (passed in April 1962), which would make it harder for non-whites to migrate to Britain. She also campaigned for the release of Nelson Mandela, and spoke out against racism in the workplace.

West Indian Gazette and Afro-Asian Caribbean News, 1958
From her experiences in the United States, Jones believed that "people without a voice were as lambs to the slaughter." In March 1958 above a barber's shop in Brixton, she founded and thereafter edited the West Indian Gazette, its full title subsequently displayed on its masthead as West Indian Gazette and Afro-Asian Caribbean News (WIG). The paper became a key contributor to the rise of consciousness within the Black British community.

Jones wrote in her last published essay, "The Caribbean Community in Britain", in Freedomways (Summer 1964):

Always strapped for cash, WIG folded eight months and four editions after Jones's death in December 1964.

Notting Hill riots and "Caribbean Carnival", 1959

In August 1958, four months after the launch of WIG, the Notting Hill race riots occurred, as well as similar earlier disturbances in Robin Hood Chase, Nottingham. In view of the racially driven analysis of these events by the existing daily newspapers, Jones began receiving visits from members of the black British community and also from various national leaders responding to the concern of their citizens, including Cheddi Jagan of British Guiana, Norman Manley of Jamaica, Eric Williams of Trinidad and Tobago, as well as Phyllis Shand Allfrey and Carl La Corbinière of the West Indies Federation.

As a result, Claudia identified the need to "wash the taste of Notting Hill and Nottingham out of our mouths". It was suggested that the British black community should have a carnival; it was December 1958, so the next question was: "In the winter?" Jones used her connections to gain use of St Pancras Town Hall in January 1959 for the first Mardi-Gras-based carnival, directed by Edric Connor (who in 1951 had arranged for the Trinidad All Steel Percussion Orchestra to appear at the Festival of Britain) and with the Boscoe Holder Dance Troupe, jazz guitarist Fitzroy Coleman and singer Cleo Laine headlining; the event was televised nationally by the BBC. These early celebrations were epitomised by the slogan: "A people's art is the genesis of their freedom."

A footnote on the front cover of the original 1959 souvenir brochure states: "A part of the proceeds [from the sale] of this brochure are to assist the payments of fines of coloured and white youths involved in the Notting Hill events." Jones and the West Indian Gazette also organised five other annual indoor Caribbean Carnival cabarets at such London venues as Seymour Hall, Porchester Hall and the Lyceum Ballroom, which events are seen as precursors of the celebration of Caribbean Carnival that culminated in the outdoor Notting Hill Carnival that began on the streets in the mid-1960s.

Death

Jones died in London on Christmas Eve 1964, aged 49, and was found on Christmas Day at her flat. A post-mortem declared that she had suffered a massive heart attack, due to heart disease and tuberculosis.

Her funeral on 9 January 1965 was a large and political ceremony, with her burial plot selected to be that located to the left of the tomb of her hero, Karl Marx, in Highgate Cemetery, North London. A message from Paul Robeson was read out:

Works
In the 1950s, Jones published a column called "Half of the World" in the Daily Worker newspaper.

Articles
 "Discussion Article", Political Affairs (August 1943)
 "For New Approaches to Our Work among Women", Political Affairs (August 1948)
 "Women Crusade for Peace," The Worker Magazine (1950)
 "100 Women's Delegates Back World Peace Plea", Daily Worker (1950)
 "International Women's Day and the Struggle for Peace", Political Affairs (March 1950)
 "Claudia Jones Writes from Ellis Island", Daily Worker (8 November 1950)
 "For the Unity of Women in the Case of Peace", Political Affairs (1951)
 "Warmakers Fear America's Women," Daily Worker (1951)
 "For the Unity of Women in the Cause of Peace!", Political Affairs (February 1951)
 "Foster’s Political and Theoretical Guidance to Our Work among Women", Political Affairs (March 1951)
 "Call Negro Women to Sojourn for Justice", Daily Worker (20 September 1951)
 "Sojourners for Truth and Justice", The Worker Magazine (1952)
 "The Struggle for Peace in the United States", Political Affairs (1952))
 "Her Words Rang Out beyond the Walls of the Courthouse", Daily Worker (21 November 1952)
 "American Imperialism and the British West Indies", Political Affairs (April 1958)
 "The Caribbean Community in Britain", Freedomways (1964)
 "First Lady of the World:  I Talk with Mme Sun Yat–Sen", West Indian Gazette and Afro-Asian Caribbean News (November 1964)
 "An End to the Neglect of the Problems of Negro Women, June 1949", Political Affairs (March 1974)

 Book chapters
 "Claudia Jones," Communists Speak to the Court (1953)

Books
 Autobiographical  History (6 December 1955 – unpublished)
 Claudia Jones: Beyond Containment: Autobiographical Reflections, Essays, and Poems (2011)

Legacy and influence
The National Union of Journalists' Black Members' Council holds a prestigious annual Claudia Jones Memorial Lecture every October, during Black History Month, to honour Jones and celebrate her contribution to Black-British journalism.

The Claudia Jones Organisation was founded in London in 1982 by Yvette Thomas and others to support and empower women and families of African-Caribbean heritage.

Winsome Pinnock's 1989 play A Rock in Water was inspired by the life of Claudia Jones.

Jones is named on the list of 100 Great Black Britons (2003 and 2020) and in the 2020 book.

In August 2008, a blue plaque was unveiled on the corner of Tavistock Road and Portobello Road commemorating Claudia Jones as the "Mother of Caribbean Carnival in Britain".

In October 2008, Britain's Royal Mail commemorated Jones with a special postage stamp.

She is the subject of a documentary film by Z. Nia Reynolds, Looking for Claudia Jones (2010).

In 2018 Jones was named by the Evening Standard on a list of 14 "Inspirational black British women throughout history" (alongside Phillis Wheatley, Mary Seacole, Adelaide Hall, Margaret Busby, Olive Morris, Connie Mark, Joan Armatrading, Tessa Sanderson, Doreen Lawrence, Maggie Aderin-Pocock, Sharon White, Malorie Blackman, Diane Abbott and Zadie Smith).

Bustle magazine included Jones on a list of "7 Black British Women Throughout History That Deserve To Be Household Names In 2019", together with Mary Prince, Evelyn Dove, Olive Morris, Margaret Busby, Olivette Otele, and Shirley Thompson.

Jones appeared as a prominent character in Yasmin Joseph's 2019 play J'Ouvert, which premiered at Theatre 503 before transferring to the Harold Pinter Theatre in 2021.

On 14 October 2020, Jones was honoured with a Google Doodle.

Many British communists have argued that her participation in the British communist movement has been both obscured and denied by organisations keen to use her image.

A sculpture of Claudia Jones by artist Favour Jonathan, created as part of the 2021 Sky Arts series Landmark, is on display at Black Cultural Archives in Brixton.

In January 2023, English Heritage announced that a blue plaque would be unveiled later that year on a house in Vauxhall that Jones shared for almost four years.

Commemoration of the 100th anniversary of her birth
Various activities took place from June 2014 onwards. The most successful were possibly those organised by Community Support, which put substantial resources into basic research into aspects of her life and work.

This led to new revelations and rediscoveries about Claudia Jones, not included in the three printed biographies, or the film biography.

Community Support organised A Claudia Jones 100 Day on the 100th anniversary of her birth at Kennington Park Estate Community Centre on Saturday, 21 February 2015. This began with a guided tour showing her two main residences while she lived in London, and the former West Indian Gazette office nearby.

There was also a celebration at The Cloth, in Belmont, Port of Spain, Trinidad and Tobago, near to her birthplace, on the same day.

The Day was associated with an event held on the previous evening at Claudia Jones Organisation in Hackney, which featured a screening of the film Looking for Claudia Jones by Z. Nia Reynolds.

See also
 Trevor Carter
 Billy Strachan
 Len Johnson
 Dorothy Kuya
 Paul Robeson
 Buzz Johnson
 Communist Party of the USA

References

Sources
 Claudia Jones, "We Seek Full Equality for Women (1949)."
 Buzz Johnson, "I Think of My Mother": Notes on the Life and Times of Claudia Jones, London: Karia Press, 1985. .
 Marika Sherwood, Claudia Jones: A Life in Exile: A Biography, Lawrence & Wishart, 1999. .
 "Claudia Jones", Special issue: BASA Newsletter #44, January 2006
 Carole Boyce Davies, Left of Karl Marx: The Political Life of Black Communist Claudia Jones, Duke University Press, 2008. .
 Carole Boyce Davies, Claudia Jones: Beyond Containment, Ayebia Clarke Publishing, 2011. .

Further reading
 
 
 Gore, Dayo. Radicalism at the Crossroads: African American Women Activists in the Cold War. NYU Press, 2011.
 
 Guy-Sheftall, Beverly, Words of Fire: an Anthology of African-American Feminist Thought. The New Press, 1995.
 Howard, Walter T. We Shall Be Free!: Black Communist Protests in Seven Voices. Philadelphia, PA: Temple University Press, 2013.
 Marable, Manning, & Leith Mullings, Let Nobody Turn Us Around: Voices of Resistance, Reform, and Renewal. Rowman & Littlefield, 2009.
 Washington, Mary Helen, "Alice Childress, Lorraine Hansberry and Claudia Jones: Black Women Write the Popular Front", in Bill V. Mullin and James Smethurst (eds), Left of the Color Line: Race, Radicalism and 20th Century United States Literature. Chapel Hill: University of North Carolina Press, 2003.

External links

 List of 100 great black Britons 
 "Claudia Jones", Exploring 20th Century London.
 "Mother of the Mas", biodata for Claudia Cumberbatch Jones, Fox Carnival Band.
 Ian Thomson, "Here To Stay", article on Donald Hinds, referencing Claudia Jones.
 "Claudia Jones The Black Woman that created London Carnival". YouTube video.
 Anna Clarke, "Remembering Claudia Jones, pioneer of the Notting Hill Carnival", The Daily Telegraph, 26 September 2018.

1915 births
1964 deaths
20th-century deaths from tuberculosis
20th-century journalists
African-American feminists
African-American Marxists
American communists
American emigrants to England
American feminists
American Marxist journalists
American Marxists
American women journalists
Black British activists
Black British women writers
British communists
British feminists
British Marxist journalists
British Marxists
British socialists
British women activists
British women Marxists
Burials at Highgate Cemetery
Marxist feminists
Members of the Communist Party USA
New York (state) socialists
Notting Hill
People convicted under the Smith Act
People deported from the United States
People from Harlem
People from Notting Hill
People from Port of Spain
Prisoners and detainees of the United States federal government
Radical feminists
Trinidad and Tobago activists
Trinidad and Tobago communists
Trinidad and Tobago emigrants to the United Kingdom
Trinidad and Tobago feminists
Trinidad and Tobago journalists
Trinidad and Tobago socialists
Trinidad and Tobago women journalists
Tuberculosis deaths in England
Women Marxists